The Battle of Anchialus refers to three battles between Bulgaria and the Byzantine Empire.

 Battle of Anchialus (708), where Bulgarian Khan Tervel routed the force of Byzantine emperor Justinian II and reaffirmed his right to the region of Zagora in present-day south-east Bulgaria.
 Battle of Anchialus (763), where Byzantine emperor Constantine V with 9000 cavalry defeated the Bulgarians under Telets. Telets was assassinated after the defeat.
 Battle of Achelous (917), took place near Anchialus. Simeon I of Bulgaria defeated a larger Byzantine army under Leo Phokas the Elder.